Michael Hennagin (17 September 1936 – 4 June 1993) was an American composer and university professor.

Life and career
Hennagin was born in The Dalles, Oregon. He studied composition at the Curtis Institute of Music in Philadelphia and at summer festivals in Aspen and Tanglewood. His composition teachers included Darius Milhaud and Aaron Copland.

Hennagin began his professional career as a Hollywood composer and arranger working in film and television. He composed in all media, and music for both instrumental and vocal ensembles, including frequently performed pieces for choir, symphonic band and orchestra, and percussion ensemble. Notable compositions include soundtracks for The DuPont Show of the Week and the television series Voyage to the Bottom of the Sea, ballet scores for the Lester Horton Dance Theater in Los Angeles, and his Duo Chopinesque for Percussion Ensemble and Walking on the Green Grass for Choir are performed frequently. His compositions are published by Walton Music, Southern Music Company, and Boosey and Hawkes.

He received awards from American Society of Composers, Authors and Publishers (ASCAP) recognizing his continued commercial influence and success, and he was named National Composer of the Year in 1975 by the Music Teachers National Association. He was commissioned several times by the Gregg Smith Singers. Shortly before his death, Ohio State University honored him with a week-long festival and he traveled to New York City where The Gregg Smith Singers premiered a new choral work at Carnegie Hall.

He came to the University of Oklahoma in 1972 where he was composer-in-residence and taught composition until his retirement in 1992. The Michael Hennagin Prize in Composition is awarded biennially by the University of Oklahoma. He retired, in part, to devote more time to his composing and accept new commissions. For his last work, "Proud Music," he returned to the poetry of Walt Whitman, combining the texts of "Proud Music of the Storm" and "I Hear America Singing".

Hennagin died suddenly in his home, at the age of 56, on 11 June 1993.

Students 
Ted Hammond, veterinarian and amusement park consultant

Jas Miller, composer, recording artist, teacher, author, San Diego, CA
Dr. Cheryl Bates, University of Houston, DMA (Music Education); University of North Texas PhD music theory in progress; Lone Star College – Tomball (retired professor of music)
Dr. Roland Barrett, Director of the School of Music, University of Oklahoma
Joseph Blaha, Roanoke College
Nancy Cobb-Lippens, Director of the School of Music, Florida Gulf Coast University
Richard Ford, composer
Ted Hammond, veterinarian and amusement park consultant
Corey A. Jackson, composer
Carvin Knowles, composer
Anthony Lis, South Dakota State University
Casey McClure, Internet Marketing Specialist, Advanced Academics, Inc.
Stephen Sewell, Composer
Paul Steinberg, Director of the Center for New Music Resources at Crane School
rogerallenward, composer
Mark Wilder, composer
Blake Wilkins, University of Houston
Stephen L. Yarbrough, University of South Dakota

The Michael Hennagin Prize in Composition recipients 
The Michael Hennagin Prize in Composition is awarded biennially by the University of Oklahoma.

2005 Éric Champagne, Champ-de-Mars, par jour de lumière
2003 Christopher Palestrant, Lesbia Catulli
2001 Joseph Blaha, The Night Watch
1999 Dana Wilson, Primal Worlds

Notes

References
Bates, Cheryl; Analyses of Selected Published Choral Works of Michael Hennagin Dissertation, University of Houston, 2005.

External links
 Film Score Monthly article on Hennagin's time in Hollywood and relation to Jerry Goldsmith
 Encyclopedia of Oklahoma History and Culture – Hennagin, Michael (archive from 28 December 2017; accessed 27 January 2018).
 – Catalog of Michael Hennagin choral works compiled by Ray Wheeler

1936 births
1993 deaths
20th-century classical composers
American male classical composers
American classical composers
American film score composers
People from The Dalles, Oregon
Singers from Oklahoma
Curtis Institute of Music alumni
20th-century American composers
20th-century American singers
American male film score composers
20th-century American male musicians